Turbo Fast is an American flash-animated web television series based on the 2013 computer-animated film Turbo. Produced by DreamWorks Animation Television and animated by Titmouse, it is being exclusively released on Netflix in United States and in the 40 countries where Netflix offers its services at the time, but it became available worldwide via Netflix over time. It is the first Netflix original series for children, and the first DreamWorks Animation series produced for Netflix.

The first five episodes of the first 26-episode season were released on December 24, 2013, with subsequent batches of five to six episodes following around holidays throughout 2014. Each episode consists of two 11-minutes segments, except for few double-length episodes. Season 2 was released on Netflix on July 31, 2015. The third and final season was released on Netflix on February 5, 2016.

Set five months after the events of the film, the series follows Turbo and his crew to Starlight City, where they master new stunts and compete with villains. It is being animation directed by Mike Roush, casting and voice directed by Andrea Romano, art directed by Antonio Canobbio, produced by Ben Kalina, Shannon Barrett Prynoski and Jennifer Ray, and executive produced by Chris Prynoski and Jack Thomas. Beside Ken Jeong and Mike Bell, who reprise their roles of Kim-Ly and White Shadow from the film, the series features an all-new cast. It consists of Reid Scott as Turbo, John Eric Bentley as Whiplash, Grey DeLisle-Griffin as Burn, Phil LaMarr as Smoove Move, Amir Talai as Skidmark and Tito, and Eric Bauza as Chet.

Premise
Five months after the events of Turbo (2013), Tito builds a city for all the snails along with Turbo, additionally building a race track for the snails to race. Turbo continues his racing adventures with the help of his brother Chet, and his friends Whiplash, Burn, Skidmark, White Shadow, and Smoove Move. Together they decide to call themselves the Fast Action Stunt Team, or F.A.S.T.

Characters
 Turbo/Theodore "Theo" (voiced by Reid Scott) – The main protagonist of Turbo, a snail who has gained super speed and abilities similar to a car after being swallowed by a car engine which infused his DNA with Nitrous oxide, and who has won the Indy 500 with said powers.
 Chester "Chet" (voiced by Eric Bauza) – Turbo's paranoid older brother, who is the main safety patrolman of Turbotown and the manager of the F.A.S.T. crew. He is also Burn's boyfriend. His shell is equipped with an ambulance/helicopter, nicknamed the ‘Shellcopter’.
 Whitney "Whiplash" Chubbington (voiced by John Eric Bentley) – The tough-as-nails leader of the F.A.S.T. crew, whose shell is equipped with a jet engine. Despite his gruff attitude, he has a fondness for lavender lotion.
 Skip "Skidmark" Markovich (voiced by Amir Talai) – The F.A.S.T. crew's main mechanic, whose shell is equipped with a propeller. He is fond of conspiracy theories, which seems to annoy the other team members, despite most of them proving to be true. Despite his idiosyncrasies, he is a devoted team member. He is best friends with White Shadow.
 Bernice "Burn" Guzman (voiced by Grey DeLisle) -The only female member of the F.A.S.T. crew. She is a hot-head with a sassy attitude. She is also known for her co-leadership and passion for racing , gum, and Chet who is her boyfriend. Her shell is equipped with a flamethrower .
 Whitman "White Shadow" Shafford (voiced by Michael Patrick Bell) – The largest snail in the F.A.S.T. crew, who has a habit of acting stealthy, though his large size is a disadvantage. He is best friends with Skidmark, and often proves to be just as quirky as him. He is somewhat dim-witted and a big eater. His shell is equipped with tires.
 Smoove Move (voiced by Phil LaMarr) – The "grooviest" snail of the F.A.S.T. crew, whose shell is equipped with bass speakers. He has a taste for funk and rap music, which help him to "groove" through the track. He is also a DJ and has a knack for painting.
 Guy Gagné (voiced by Jeff Bennett) - A disgraced former racer and Turbo's arch-nemesis.
 Hardcase (voiced by Diedrich Bader) – A tiger beetle who envies Turbo's fame and wishes to outrace him, even resorting to cheating. He does not tolerate losing, and even threatens to ravage Turbotown until he wins a race.
 Tito (voiced by Amir Talai) – A snail race trainer and the employee of Dos Bros Tacos.
 Kim-Ly (voiced by Ken Jeong) – An elderly manicurist at Starlight Plaza.
 Darryl (voiced by Ron Perlman) – Turbo and Chet's father.
 Howie (voiced by Billy West) – A lunatic moth.
 Jack. A. Lopez (voiced by Billy West) – A jackalope.
 Queen Banananica (voiced by Dawnn Lewis) – An Africa snail queen.
 Chickipede (voiced by Phil LaMarr) – A chicken-centipede mutant hybrid.
 Brahdhi and Warlarva (voiced by Jeff Bennett, Mark Hamill) – Surfing cockroaches along with Jimmy Delaware.
 Breakneck (voiced by Mark Hamill) – Whiplash's rival and former mentor.
 Deuce (voiced by Grey DeLisle) - A troublemaking young snail who aspire to be like Turbo.
 Mel Shellman (voiced by Daran Norris) - A snail announcer.
 Buster Move (voiced by Dana Snyder) – Smoove Move's brother.
 Princess Damselfly (voiced by Daniella Monet) – A damselfly princess.
 Princess Thora (voiced by Rachael MacFarlane) – A praying mantis princess. She is one of Turbo's love interests and his ex-fiancee. Although they're no longer a couple, they still remained friends.
 F.A.J.I.T.A. – Enemies of the F.A.S.T. crew. It consists of Fusion (voiced by Will Friedle), Lightning (voiced by John Eric Bentley (voice actor)), Groove Rider (voiced by Phil LaMarr), Snap (voiced by Grey DeLisle), Peel-Out (voiced by Eric Bauza), and Mondo Tires (voiced by Michael Patrick Bell). While most of shells for F.A.J.I.T.A. are based on the Shells of the F.A.S.T. crew, Fusion's shell is powered by a Fusion Engine, unlike Turbo's, whose power is all natural.
 Dean Cuisine (voiced by Amir Talai) - A villainous celebrity chef and the owner of F.A.J.I.T.A. crew.
 Shellworth (voiced by Maurice LaMarche) - A rich snail, LaMarche also voiced Shellworth's owner.
 Aiden Hardshell (voiced by JB Blanc) - A snail actor from Hollywood whose appearances are similar to White Shadow.
 Rockwell (voiced by Steven Blum) – A turtle.
 Barth (voiced by Jim Breuer) – A lizard.
 Marty (voiced by Dave Willis) – A toad.
 Dash Dunghammer (voiced by John DiMaggio) – A dung beetle who is the friend of White Shadow.
 Count Tickula (voiced by Maurice LaMarche) – A vampire tick who is very happy about everything.
 Simone (voiced by Vicki Lewis) – An Arctic hare.
 Edvard (voiced by Alexander Polinsky) – Tickula's son who broods a lot and says "whatever" every time.
 Rudy Guana (voiced by Maurice LaMarche) – An iguana.
 Cajun Cliche (voiced by Jim Cummings) – A crawfish from Louisiana.
 Baron Von Schwartzhozen (voiced by Steve Valentine) – A German accented wasp.
 Gigundesh (voiced by Gary Anthony Williams) – A rhinoceros beetle.
 The Stinger (voiced by Kevin Conroy) – A self-proclaimed superhero wasp.
 Clip and Clap (voiced by Brendon Small) - A pair of hermit crab twins who likes to steal.
 Ace Gecko (voiced by Jeff Bennett) – A con artist who regularly makes false deals with the citizens of Turbotown, especially Chet. Although he dons the alias "Gecko", he is actually a newt.
 Bramber (voiced by Grey DeLisle) – A butterfly actress and Ace's acquiantance.
 Hayaku (voiced by Lauren Tom) – A Japanese cricket who pretends to be in love with Turbo in order to beat him in a race in Tokyo. Although she still claims him to be her enemy, Turbo still believes she has feelings for him. Her name means "Quickly" in Japanese.
 Queen Invicta (voiced by Laraine Newman) – A fire ant queen.
 Captain Dirtbeard (voiced by John DiMaggio) – A rat who is a pirate captain who regularly tries to get revenge on Turbo and the F.A.S.T crew and once ruined everyone's food supply to sell packets in a smuggling operation.
 Slushbeard (voiced by John DiMaggio) – Dirtbeard's brother.
 Wild Pete (voiced by Norman Reedus) – An outlaw cricket.

Series overview

Episodes

Season 1 (2013–2014)
The series premiered on December 24, 2013, when the first five episodes of the first season were released. Following batches of five episodes were released on April 4, 2014, June 27, 2014, September 12, 2014, and December 1, 2014.

Five-episode release is a departure from previous Netflix release strategy, where an entire season of a series was released at once. Netflix explained the change of the strategy: "Production on animation is on a different timetable, so we chose to make the episodes that are ready now available for viewers as they were ready." However, they went back to the original formula of a full-season release for the remaining two seasons.

Season 2 (2015)

Season 3 (2016)

Production
Turbo Fast is the first project coming out of the five-year deal between DreamWorks Animation and Netflix, which includes 300 hours of original programming or over a thousand episodes a year. For this task, DreamWorks Animation opened a new television production unit, called DreamWorks Animation Television.

Initially, the project started as a standalone special based on the Turbo film. Being impressed with racing visuals which Titmouse, Inc. created for the Disney XD series Motorcity, DreamWorks Animation contracted the studio to make the special flash-animated, rather than computer-animated. Soon after the Titmouse's founder Chris Prynoski signed on as the director, DreamWorks decided to turn the special into a series. Pryonski directed the first few episodes, and then took over as the series executive producer.

Production on the project began in the summer of 2012, a year before the film's release, when it was still undecided if the project would be a special or a series. With the film still having numerous storyboard panels instead of finished animation, Titmouse had to develop their own style: "We were inspired by the movie, but we weren't held to match the movie," said Prynoski. Titmouse's director Antoni Canobbio developed a look that felt new and cool, to suit the project's racing theme.

Beside Flash, which is the main program for animating the series, many additional tools have been used, including Maya, Photoshop and After Effects. To overcome the difficulty of animating intricately detailed snail racing shells, the studio generated 3D models of the shells in Maya, so they could rotate them to any position they wanted. Each time it was put in a new position, it  had to be cleaned up by hand to make it look like a 2D drawing. Prepared shell was then put into a library, waiting for next animator to use it when needed.

In addition to Titmouse's studios in Los Angeles and Vancouver, a "sizable piece" of the production is taking place at a couple of studios in South Korea, in order to stay on schedule. This marks the first time for DreamWorks Animation to outsource to the country. On average, it takes a crew of about 80 people about six to eight months to take each episode from premise to delivery.

Unlike previous DreamWorks Animation series, the Netflix deal allowed DreamWorks to maintain creative control. Prynoski said: "Typically, if you are working on a show like this, you might get two sets of notes: one from DreamWorks and one from the network. But we don't get notes from Netflix, which is cool. It allows us to move faster, and we can make the shows, hopefully, the way we want them."

Beside Ken Jeong and Mike Bell, who reprise their roles of Kim Ly and White Shadow, the cast features all new members. One of the reasons for this was the desire to have the actors working together. "The thing is that these actors are really busy, and we want to get talent in the same room at the same time to get that chemistry. And that's a lot easier to do with professional voice actors," said DreamWorks Animation head of television Margie Cohn. The cast was selected by the Titmouse's casting and voice director Andrea Romano, who chose people Titmouse already knew and had worked with.

Reid Scott, who replaced Ryan Reynolds as the voice of Turbo, knew Prynoski from 2000 or 2001, when they worked together on a Flash Frame pilot for AMC. After that, they lost contact, but they met again ten years later, when Scott successfully auditioned for Disney XD's Motorcity, which Prynoski created and directed. They enjoyed working together, and when Motorcity got canceled, Prynoski offered him the role in recently contracted Turbo series. Scott's initial approach to the role tried to capture Reynold's "inflection, his intonation and the character's attitude. And then slowly it took on a life of its own. The Turbo we have now is inspired by that, but he's very much his own guy." According to Scott, the same happened to all other characters, which "slowly morphed into different versions."

Awards and nominations

Home media
A DVD collection of all the season 1 episodes, titled Turbo Fast: Season 1 was released on DVD on June 2, 2015 by 20th Century Fox Home Entertainment.

References

External links
 
 

2010s American animated television series
2013 American television series debuts
2016 American television series endings
American children's animated action television series
American children's animated adventure television series
American children's animated comedy television series
American children's animated sports television series
American flash animated television series
English-language Netflix original programming
Netflix children's programming
Television series by DreamWorks Animation
Animated television shows based on films
Animated television series about animals
Animated television series about auto racing
Television shows scored by Henry Jackman